Šekularac (Serbian Cyrillic: Шекуларац) is a Serbian surname with origins in Berane, Montenegro of the Vasojevići clan. The founder was Petar Šekularac.

Dragoslav Šekularac (born 1937), Serbian footballer
Mladen Šekularac (born 1981), Montenegrin basketball player
Ana Šekularac, Serbian fashion designer

Serbian surnames